The 2021 ANZ Premiership season was the fifth season of Netball New Zealand's ANZ Premiership. With a team coached by Helene Wilson, captained by Sulu Fitzpatrick and featuring Ama Agbeze, Bailey Mes and Grace Nweke, Northern Mystics won their first ever premiership. Mystics finished the regular season as minor premiers, above Southern Steel and Mainland Tactix. In the Elimination final, Tactix defeated Steel 54–49. 
In the Grand final, Mystics defeated Tactix 61–59.

Transfers

Head coaches and captains

Pre-season

Otaki tournament
Central Pulse hosted the official ANZ Premiership tournament at Te Wānanga o Raukawa in Otaki between 26 and 28 March. All six ANZ Premiership teams took part. With two wins and a draw, Mainland Tactix were the only team not to lose a match.

Day 1

  
 
   
 
Day 2

  
  
  
 
Day 3

Regular season

Round 1

Round 2

Round 3

Round 4

Round 5

Round 6

Round 7

Round 8

Round 9

Round 10

Round 11

Round 12

Round 13

Round 14

Round 15

Notes
  The Round 11 match between Central Pulse and Mainland Tactix was postponed after a change in COVID-19 alert levels. The match was rescheduled for Friday, 9 July.

Final Standings

Finals Series

Elimination final

Grand final

Award winners

New Zealand Netball Awards

ANZ Premiership Awards

Season statistics

References 

  
2021
2021 in New Zealand netball